The wildlife of Namibia is composed of its flora and fauna. Namibia's endangered species include the wild dog, black rhino, oribi and puku.

Endangered species
The puku antelope is limited to about 100 individuals along the Chobe River in Botswana and the Linyati marshes in Namibia. The black rhino and white rhino have suffered the most from poaching and are on the verge of extinction. If there had been no effort to save them in the last 20 years they most likely would have disappeared altogether. While both species occur naturally in Namibia, in many of the reserves they have been reintroduced. The country also has the largest population in southern Africa of cheetah not contained within national parks. There are over twenty species of antelope ranging from the largest, the eland, to the smallest, the Damara dik-dik. The gemsbok, a striking antelope with long symmetrical horns and distinctive black and white markings is featured on the Namibian coat of arms. Namibia also harbours a wealth of small mammals including mongoose, jackal as well as the less common antbear and honey badger, both solitary and nocturnal.

National parks and nature reserves

Namibia's parks and reserves range from the open bush of the centre and the north where wildlife is relatively plentiful, to the barren and inhospitable coastal strip with its huge sand dunes. The three main tourist attractions for wildlife in Namibia are Etosha National Park, Waterberg National Park and Cape Cross Seal Reserve.

National parks 

Ai-Ais/Richtersveld Transfrontier Park (see also Fish River Canyon and Ai-Ais Hot Springs)
Bwabwata National Park
Etosha National Park
Khaudum National Park
Mudumu National Park
Namib-Naukluft National Park
Nkasa Rupara National Park
Skeleton Coast National Park
Waterberg National Park

Nature reserves
 Kaokoland Nature Reserve
 Khaudum Nature Reserve
 Mamili Nature Reserve
 Mudumu Nature Reserve

Fauna
Namibia has 115 species of fish (five endemic). There are about 50 species of frogs (six endemic) but neither caecilians nor salamanders. Namibia is home to 250 species of reptiles with 59 endemic. There were 1331 recorded species of arachnids with 164 endemic but there are potentially 5650 species. Records show 6331 species of insects (1541 of them are endemic). but there are expected to be 35,000 species of insects.

Freshwater insects
 19 species of Ephemeroptera
 2 species of Plecoptera
 35 species of Trichoptera
 77 species of Odonata
 179 species of Diptera
 1 species of Neuroptera
 200 species of Coleoptera
 45 species of Hemiptera
 7 species of Orthoptera

Freshwater invertebrates
 3 species of Porifera
 2 species of Cnidaria
 9 species of Platyhelminthes
 5 species of Ectoprocta
 10 species of Nematoda
 13 species of Oligochaeta
 16 species of Hirudinea
 52 species of Ostracoda
 19 species of Copepoda
 Branchiopoda
 19 species of Anostraca
 19 species of Cladocera
 2 species of Notostraca
 15 species of Conchostraca
 Malacostraca
 6 species of Amphipoda
 4 species of Isopoda
 6 species of Decapoda

Terrestrial invertebrates
 25 species of Diplopoda

Mammals

200 species of terrestrial mammals (14 of them are endemic) and 40 species of marine mammals are native to Namibia.

Birds

There are 645 species of birds (14 of them are endemic).

Mollusks

There were 26 species of freshwater snails recorded and 13 species of freshwater bivalves. A number of land gastropods are also found in Namibia.

Flora

There are 4334 species of plants recorded (683 of them are endemic).

Senecio haworthii - woolly senecio
Aloidendron dichotomum - quiver tree

References

Biota of Namibia
Namibia